Chloé Mesic (born 14 June 1991 in Boulogne Billancourt) is a professional squash player who represents France. She reached a career-high world ranking of World No. 56 in March 2017.

Career
In 2016, she was part of the French team that won the bronze medal at the 2016 Women's World Team Squash Championships in her home country.

References

External links 
 
 

French female squash players
Living people
1991 births
Sportspeople from Boulogne-Billancourt